Khizar Hayat Durrani (born 1 April 1989) is a Malaysian cricketer. He was a member of the Malaysian team during the 2014 ICC World Cricket League Division Three tournament.

In February 2020, he was named in Malaysia's Twenty20 International (T20I) squad for the 2020 Interport T20I Series against Hong Kong. He made his T20I debut for Malaysia, against Hong Kong, on 20 February 2020. In the match, he took a wicket with his first delivery, and became the first bowler for Malaysia to take a five-wicket haul in a T20I match.

In July 2022, he was named in Malaysia's squad for the 2022 Canada Cricket World Cup Challenge League A tournament. He made his List A debut on 28 July 2022, for Malaysia against Vanuatu.

References

External links
 

1989 births
Living people
Malaysian cricketers
Malaysia Twenty20 International cricketers
Pakistani expatriates in Malaysia
Malaysian people of Pakistani descent
Cricketers from Peshawar